The 2008 Mondial Australian Women's Hardcourts was a women's tennis tournament played on outdoor hard courts. It was the 12th and final edition of the Mondial Australian Women's Hardcourts, which was renamed and relocated to Brisbane, and was part of the Tier III Series of the 2008 WTA Tour. It took place in Gold Coast, Queensland, Australia, from 31 December 2007 through 5 January 2008. Unseeded Li Na won the singles title and earned $28,000 first-prize money.

This was the last edition of the tournament in Gold Coast, Queensland. In 2009 the women's tournament was merged with the  men's tournament and became the Brisbane International.

Finals

Singles

 Li Na defeated  Victoria Azarenka, 4–6, 6–3, 6–4
It was Na Li's 1st title of the year, and her 2nd overall.

Doubles

 Dinara Safina /  Ágnes Szávay defeated  Yan Zi /  Zheng Jie, 6–1, 6–2

Points and prize money

Point distribution

Prize money

* per team

External links
 ITF tournament edition details
 Tournament draws

 
Mondial Australian Women's Hardcourts
2008
Mondial Australian Women's Hardcourts
Mondial Australian Women's Hardcourts
Mondial Australian Women's Hardcourts